Pradipbhai Khanabhai Parmar is an Indian politician and member of the Bharatiya Janata Party. He is currently serving as Cabinet Minister of Social Justice and Empowerment, Government of Gujarat. He is a first-term member of the Gujarat Legislative Assembly and contested himself from the Asarwa constituency in the city of Ahmedabad.

Political Career

 1987-90: Pradip Parmar served as President of BJP's SC Morcha Chamanpura Ward, Ahmedabad City.
 1990-92: He served as the Secretary of BJP's SC Morcha, Ahmedabad City.
 1992: He was BJP's candidate for Ahmedabad Municipal Corporation Election from Chamanpura Ward, Ahmedabad City.
 1993-95: He served as the Vice President of BJP's SC Morcha, Ahmedabad City.
 1995: He was BJP's candidate for the Ahmedabad Municipal Corporation Election from Naroda Road Ward, Ahmedabad City, He lost the election by a mere margin of 54 votes.
 1996-98: He again served as the Vice President of BJP's SC Morcha, Ahmedabad City.
 2000-02: He served as the Gujarat State Executive Member of BJP's SC Morcha.
 2002-04: He served as the General Secretary of BJP Naroda Road Ward, Ahmedabad City.
 2009: He served as the President of BJP Naroda Road Ward, Ahmedabad City.
 2010-13: He served as the Secretary of BJP, Ahmedabad City.
 2013-16: He served as the General Secretary of BJP's SC Morcha, Ahmedabad City.
 2016-17: He served as the In-charge of BJP Khadia Ward, Ahmedabad City.
 2017: He contested the Gujarat State Legislative Assembly election from 56 Asarwa constituency situated in Ahmedabad City from Bhartiya Janta Party and successfully won the election by 49,250 votes highest to date of the Asarwa Constituency, His victory was also the highest win by percentage margin of the Asarwa Constituency. In the same year, He was also nominated as Gujarat University Senate Member by the Government of Gujarat.
 2018-20: He served as the Chairman of the SC Committee, Government of Gujarat.
 2021: He is currently serving as the Minister of Social Justice and Empowerment, Government of Gujarat.

References 

Living people
Bharatiya Janata Party politicians from Gujarat
People from Ahmedabad
Gujarat MLAs 2017–2022
Year of birth missing (living people)